Campbell is a large lunar impact crater that is located in the northern hemisphere on the far side of the Moon. It lies to the southwest of the walled plain D'Alembert, an even larger formation. If Campbell were located on the near side of the Moon as seen from the Earth, it would form one of the largest visible craters, being slightly larger than Schickard. It is bordered by several craters of note, with Wiener to the southwest, Von Neumann just to the south, Ley overlying the southeast rim, and Pawsey to the west.

This formation has been heavily worn and eroded by a history of impacts, leaving a circular rim that is an irregular ring of ridges and peaks. Multiple small craters lie along the rim and the inner wall, as well as across the interior floor. The most notable of these are Campbell X along the northeast inner rim and Campbell N near the southern inner wall.

Much of the inner floor is covered by a multitude of lesser impacts; the exception being a wide patch of the floor that has been resurfaced by basaltic lava. This area has a lower albedo than its surroundings, thus appearing dark. It stretches from the center of Campbell towards the western rim, and has an irregular perimeter.

There is an unusual crater lying to the south of Campbell and to the west of Von Neumann. This is formed by two or more overlapping craters, the most recent being Wiener F, a nearly hexagonal formation with a rugged interior.

Satellite craters
By convention these features are identified on lunar maps by placing the letter on the side of the crater midpoint that is closest to Campbell.

References

 
 
 
 
 
 
 
 
 
 
 
 

Impact craters on the Moon